Longtan Subdistrict is a subdistrict on the southeast portion of Dongcheng, Beijing, China. In 2020, it has a population of 53,930.

The subdistrict was named after the Longtan Lake that is located within the subdistrict.

History

Administrative divisions 
As of 2021, the Longtan Subdistrict was divided into 10 communities, all of which are listed in the table below:

References 
Dongcheng District, Beijing
Subdistricts of Beijing